Ascot is a town in the Royal Borough of Windsor and Maidenhead in Berkshire, England.

It is most notable as the location of Ascot Racecourse, home of the Royal Ascot meeting, and is reportedly the 13th most expensive town in England when taking into account the average house price, which stands at £1,019,451 as of June 2021. It is also among the ten most expensive towns in Britain to rent a property. The town comprises three areas: Ascot itself, North Ascot and South Ascot. It is in the civil parish of Sunninghill and Ascot.

Etymology
The name ’Ascot’ derives from the Old English ēast (east) and cot (cottage). Ascott in Buckinghamshire, Eastcote in London and Eastcott in Wiltshire have the same etymology.

Governance
Ascot is in the district administered by the unitary authority of the Royal Borough of Windsor and Maidenhead.  Ascot, South Ascot and a small part of North Ascot are in the civil parish of Sunninghill and Ascot, although most of North Ascot is in the civil parish of Winkfield.

Churches

Church of England
The Church of England parish church of All Saints, Ascot Heath is a red brick Gothic Revival building designed by Thomas Rushforth and built in 1864. It has a richly decorated interior. The east window of its chancel is a Jesse window with stained glass made by C.E. Kempe & Co in 1907. Above it is a rose window by Hardman & Co. The Church of England parish church of All Souls, South Ascot is another red-brick Gothic Revival building. It was designed by J.L. Pearson and built in 1896–97. It has a central tower with a pyramidal roof. Its nave has aisles of four bays. The ceilings of the chancel, baptistry and the crossing under the tower are rib vaulted. All Souls' is a Grade II* listed building. Ascot Priory was founded in 1861 for the Society of the Most Holy Trinity. It has buildings designed by the architects Charles Buckeridge, William Butterfield, George Gilbert Scott and Leonard Stokes.

Roman Catholic
The Roman Catholic church of St Francis is also a red-brick Gothic Revival building. It was designed by the Roman Catholic priest and architect A.J.C. Scoles, built in 1889 and has an apsidal chancel.

Local schools
Independent senior schools in the area include Heathfield School (an all-girls boarding school), The Marist School (a private Catholic girls school 2-18 with mixed nursery), St. George's School (a private girls senior school recently attended by Princess Beatrice of York), St Mary's School, a Catholic all-girls boarding school (which Caroline, Princess of Hanover attended), located in South Ascot and the Licensed Victuallers' School, which is located down the road from Ascot Racecourse. Papplewick is also based in Ascot. The local state secondary school in the Ascot area is Charters School in nearby Sunningdale.

Amenities
Facilities tend to be geared towards the racecourse, but there is a small range of shops in the wide High Street. Most of the expected facilities one would expect to find in a small town are here, including a supermarket, petrol station and many cafes, a Subway, Tesco Express and Sainsbury's Local). Most buildings are post-war with flats above the ground floor retail space. Heatherwood Hospital (filming location for Carry on Matron) was at the western edge of the town. Ascot  station is on a junction of the railway line from London Waterloo to Reading, Bagshot, Aldershot and Guildford, originally built by the London & South Western Railway and now operated by South Western Railway. As a consequence of the frequent service on this line, Ascot is now a commuter centre in both directions (westwards to Reading and eastwards to London).

Royal Ascot week

The centrepiece of Ascot's year is held in June: Royal Ascot is arguably the world's most famous race meeting, dating back to 1711. The British royal family attend the meeting, arriving each day in a procession of horse-drawn carriages from Windsor Castle through Windsor Great Park and the village of Cheapside. It is a major event in the British social calendar. The course is still owned by the Crown.

Economy
Ascot Racecourse employs over 70 full-time staff, which increases temporarily to 6,000 during Royal Ascot week. The village has a variety of businesses located at the Ascot Business Park, opened in 2008, including the UK headquarters of global toy manufacturer Jakks Pacific, in addition to numerous small and medium enterprises. The Chartered Institute of Building, a professional body for those working in the construction industry and built environment, is also based in Ascot.

Sport and leisure
Ascot has a Non-League football club, Ascot United F.C., and the Royal Ascot Cricket Club which play at the racecourse.

Army Cadet Force
Ascot has an Army Cadet Force unit: 4 Platoon Ascot. The unit, being badged as Irish Guards (due to the unit belonging to A Company, Berkshire ACF; a company currently badged to the Household Division), means that the unit regularly sees Irish Guards events such as the St. Patrick's Day Parade, and even has the privilege of taking part in an Irish Guards ACF skills competition, run by the battalion. It actively recruits from the local and surrounding area. The unit used to parade at Ascot Racecourse, however, they were evicted due to an appeal made by the racecourse owners. They now temporarily parade at Sunningdale Parish Hall, Broomhill Lane.

Notable residents
Boris Berezovsky (1946–2013), an exiled Russian tycoon, lived and died in Ascot
Josh Cuthbert (1992–), singer from Union J
Chris Evans (1966–), English presenter, businessman and producer for radio and television, lives in Ascot
Sarah Harding (1981–2021), singer, Girls Aloud, born in Ascot
Nick Hendrix (1985-), actor, born in Ascot
John Lennon (1940–1980) and Ringo Starr (1940–) of The Beatles, successively lived at Tittenhurst Park, Ascot
Camilla Luddington (1983–), actress, born and raised in Ascot
Marti Pellow (1965–), singer of Wet Wet Wet, lives in Ascot
Adam Roberts (1965–), science fiction author, lives in North Ascot
Jake Ball (1991-), Welsh rugby player

References

Sources

External links

Ascot Village Website
Royal Berkshire History: Ascot
Potted History of Sunninghill and Ascot

Towns in Berkshire
Royal Borough of Windsor and Maidenhead
Sunninghill and Ascot